Diamondy is a rural locality in the Western Downs Region, Queensland, Australia.

Geography 
The locality is bounded to the east by the ridge of the Craig Range, part of the Great Dividing Range.

Glenmorriston is a neighbourhood in the south-west of the locality.

Norjinghi is a neighbourhood in the south-west of the locality.

The Diamondy State Forest is in the north-east of the locality, extending into neighbouring Darr Creek, Chahpingah and Ironpot. Apart from this, the land use is a mix of crops and grazing on native vegetation.

History 

Education 
There are no schools in Diamondy. The nearest primary school is Jandowae State School in neighbouring Jandowae to the south-west. The nearest secondary schools are Jandowae State School (to Year 10) in Jandowae, Kingaroy State High School (to Year 12) in Kingaroy to the north-east, and Dalby State High School in Dalby to the south.

References 

Western Downs Region
Localities in Queensland